Oru Kadamkatha Pole is a 1993 Indian Malayalam-language film, directed by Joshy Mathew and produced by Achachi, Balan and Mathew Thomas. The film stars Jayaram, Geetha, Nedumudi Venu and Ashokan in the lead roles. The musical score of the film is performed by Mohan Sithara.

Plot
A newly married couple rents a house and begins to stay there. But they are in constant fear that their relatives might come looking for them as they had married against their wishes.

Cast
 
Jayaram as Venugopal 
Geetha as Radha, Venugopal's elder sister 
Maathu as Sandhya , Venugopal's wife 
Ashokan as Balagopalan 
Nedumudi Venu as Shekhara Warrior 
Adoor Bhavani as Naniyamma 
Kaviyoor Ponnamma as Shekhara Warrior's mother 
Innocent as Pillai,Marriage Brockar 
Idavela Babu as Unni 
Oduvil Unnikrishnan as Kaimal 
 T.P Madhavan as Anantha Krishnan,Bank Manager 
 Usharani as Alamelu, Anantha Krishnan 's wife
 Bindu Panikker as Sarala 
 Jagannatha Varma as Sandhya's father
 Thodupuzha Vasanthi as Chinnu, servant

Soundtrack
The music was composed by Mohan Sithara.

References

External links
  
 

1993 films
1990s Malayalam-language films